Macrorhoptus is a genus of beetles in the family Curculionidae. There are about 6 described species in Macrorhoptus.

Species
 Macrorhoptus estriatus LeConte, 1876
 Macrorhoptus griseus Sleeper, 1957
 Macrorhoptus hispidus Dietz, 1891
 Macrorhoptus niger Hatch, 1971
 Macrorhoptus sidalceae Sleeper, 1957
 Macrorhoptus sphaeralciae Pierce, 1908

References

 Alonso-Zarazaga, Miguel A., and Christopher H. C. Lyal (1999). A World Catalogue of Families and Genera of Curculionoidea (Insecta: Coleoptera) (Excepting Scotylidae and Platypodidae), 315.
 Poole, Robert W., and Patricia Gentili, eds. (1996). "Coleoptera". Nomina Insecta Nearctica: A Check List of the Insects of North America, vol. 1: Coleoptera, Strepsiptera, 41-820.

Further reading

 Arnett, R. H. Jr., M. C. Thomas, P. E. Skelley and J. H. Frank. (eds.). (21 June 2002). American Beetles, Volume II: Polyphaga: Scarabaeoidea through Curculionoidea. CRC Press LLC, Boca Raton, Florida .
 Arnett, Ross H. (2000). American Insects: A Handbook of the Insects of America North of Mexico. CRC Press.
 Richard E. White. (1983). Peterson Field Guides: Beetles. Houghton Mifflin Company.

Curculioninae